Charlene Olivia Taitt (born 2 September 1984) is a Barbadian cricketer who plays as a right-arm off break bowler and right-handed batter. Between 2008 and 2010, she appeared in 16 One Day Internationals and 1 Twenty20 International for the West Indies. Taitt played in the 2009 Women's Cricket World Cup, and was a member of the West Indies squad at the 2009 ICC Women's World Twenty20. She plays domestic cricket for Barbados.

References

External links

1984 births
Living people
West Indian women cricketers
West Indies women One Day International cricketers
West Indies women Twenty20 International cricketers
Barbadian women cricketers